Present is Yuki Uchida's sixth album (including one EP) and first compilation album, which includes eight "A-side" and one "B side" songs from her previous singles, one song from her previous album, and two unreleased tracks. It was released in Japan on December 3, 1997, by King Records (reference: KICS-630). It reached number 33 on the Oricon charts.

Track listing

 
 
 Only You
 Baby's Growing Up
 
 
  (from Nakitakunalu album)
 
 Da.i.su.ki.
 Uchida no Rock'n'Roll (from Da.i.su.ki. single)
  (unreleased track)
  (unreleased track)

Yuki Uchida albums
1997 compilation albums